Yusuf Ali Kenadid (1890 14 August 1911) was a Somali Sultan. He was the founder of the Sultanate of Hobyo in April 1878. He was succeeded atop the throne by his son Ali Yusuf Kenadid.

Family
Yusuf Ali Kenadid was born into the Bah Yaaqub (part of the larger Bah Dirooble) branch of the Osman Mahamuud, Majeerteen Darod family. He is the father of Osman Yusuf Kenadid, who would go on to create the Osmanya writing script for the Somali language. Yusuf Ali's grandson, Yasin Osman Kenadid, would later help found the Society for Somali Language and Literature.

Yusuf Ali was not a lineal descendant of the previous dynasties that governed over northeastern Somalia. He independently amassed his own fortune, and would later evolve into a skilled military leader commanding more senior troops. "Kenadid" was not his surname, but rather a title given to him by his rivals.

As per custom among the period's prominent urban traders, to ensure commercial success in the interior, Kenadid married a local woman. While traveling to the coast in his capacity as a merchant prince, he would thereafter entrust his business affairs to his second wife, Khadija. Her duties during her husband's absence included maintaining the extant commercial transactions with the local population, collecting debts, securing loans, and safeguarding merchandise stock that had been acquired during previous journeys.

Yusf Ali's son, Ali Yusuf, succeeded him as Sultan of Hobyo.

Majeerteen and Hobyo Sultanates

Initially, Kenadid's goal was to seize control of the neighboring Majeerteen Sultanate (Migiurtinia), which was then ruled by his cousin Boqor Osman Mahamuud. However, he was unsuccessful in this endeavor, and was eventually forced into exile in Yemen. A decade later, in the 1870s, Kenadid returned from the Arabian Peninsula with a band of Hadhrami musketeers and a group of devoted lieutenants.

Hobyo-Italian protectorate treaty
After consolidating his power in Hobyo, to protect himself from further Zanzibari hostility, he signed a protectorate treaty with Italy, still a power present only nominally. In fact, asking for protection from the English, already firmly established in 'Aden and Berbera, would have meant limiting one's autonomy and therefore one's ambitions. The Italian authorities were also informed by Yusuf Ali himself from the first contacts for the establishment of the protectorate. However, there was no direct intervention and this was probably the demonstration that the choice of Italy as protector could be the most congenial precisely because it was unable to intervene in the internal affairs of the Sultanate. And that was probably the reason why Keenadiid was able to later convince the more reluctant Boqor Cismaan to also accept the Italian protective umbrella over the Sultanate in Bari. Italian protection would play a very important role in the expansion of the Sultanate towards the interior. In 1889, when the protectorate agreement was signed, the sultanal power was only consolidated on a limited stretch of the coast: the agreement, on the other hand, recognized him as sovereign between Ras Awath (Cabaad), to the north, up to in Mereeg at noon, then the entire outlet to the sea of the Habar Gidir region. Instead, the northern part of Mudug, Cumar Maxamuud, was initially excluded from the agreement, including the Abgaal-Waceesle area of Mereeg which as we will see will be the source of subsequent conflicts. This protective umbrella was a guarantee from the interventions of other external powers among them Germany - but the expansion of the sovereignty of the Sultanate inwards was a personal initiative of the Sultan.

The terms of each treaty specified that Italy was to steer clear of any interference in the sultanates' respective administrations. In return for Italian arms and an annual subsidy, the Sultans conceded to a minimum of oversight and economic concessions. The Italians also agreed to dispatch a few ambassadors to promote both the sultanates' and their own interests.

Exile
However, the relationship between Obbia Sultanate and Italy soured when Sultan Kenadid refused the Italians' proposal to allow a British contingent of troops to disembark in his Sultanate so that they might then pursue their battle against Diiriye Guure and his emir Mohammed Abdullah Hassan's Dervish forces. Viewed as too much of a threat by the Italians, Sultan Kenadid was eventually exiled to Aden in Yemen and then to Eritrea, as was his son Ali Yusuf, the heir apparent to his throne. However, unlike the southern territories, the northern sultanates were not subject to direct rule due to the earlier treaties they had signed with the Italians.

Ali Suji
According to Angus Hamilton, Cali Xaaji Axmed Aaden Suji was the highest ranked commander in the Dervish ranks in 1903, calling Ali Suji the dervish "first lieutenant". Angus also states that due to ALi Suji's high rank, Yusuf Ali Kenadid targeted Ali Suji rather than the Mullah:

Although in the early 1903 Ali Suji headed the dervish army, prior to the Ruuga battle he headed Dervish cavalry:

See also
Osman Mahamuud
Burhaan
Osman Yusuf Kenadid
Mohamoud Ali Shire

Notes

References

The Majeerteen Sultanates

External links
The Majeerteen Sultanates

Ethnic Somali people
Somali sultans
19th-century Somalian people